Mary Morgan (1788 – 15 April 1805) was a young servant in Presteigne, Radnorshire, Wales, who was convicted and hanged for killing her newborn child.

While Morgan was from Glasbury, her story has been associated with Presteigne since her execution in 1805. She was employed as an undercook at Maesllwch Castle, the seat of Walter Wilkins Esq, the Member of Parliament for the county of Radnorshire.

The murder

Morgan was working in the kitchens in the early hours of a Sunday in September 1804 when she became unwell. She later went to her room in the servant's quarters of the castle. Early that evening the cook went to her room and accused Morgan of having given birth to a baby, which at first she strongly denied. Later, according to the evidence given by the cook, Morgan "owned that she had delivered herself of a child which was in the underbed cut open, amongst the feathers with the head nearly divided from the body, and the severely damaged intestinal system removed and placed underneath the child."

Inquest and trial

The inquest on the baby was held at Glasbury two days later, and the Coroner's Jury found that:

Morgan was too ill to travel to Presteigne, where the Assizes were held, until 6 October. The trial eventually began in April 1805 before Mr Justice Hardinge, concluding on 11 April, when the jury found her guilty of murdering her child.

Death

On 13 April Morgan was hanged, and was buried in what was then unconsecrated ground near the church later that same afternoon. Her public execution attracted large crowds, who watched as she was taken by cart from the gaol to the execution at Gallows Lane. She was subsequently commemorated by two gravestones in the churchyard at Presteigne.

Myths and controversies
For some time after the execution, it was claimed the father of the murdered child was Walter Wilkins the Younger, the son of the member of parliament and high sheriff for the county and the "young squire" of Maesllwch Castle.

References 

 Citations

General references 

 Bibliography 

 Roy Plamer, "The Folklore of Radnorshire" Logaston Press, 2001,  Pages 151-54

1788 births
1805 deaths
1805 in Wales
1805 murders in the United Kingdom
19th-century executions by England and Wales
British female murderers
Executed Welsh people
Executed Welsh women
Filicides in the United Kingdom
People convicted of murder by England and Wales
People executed for murder
People from Presteigne
Welsh murderers of children
Welsh people convicted of murder